Shehab Essam (born 24 June 1995 in Oman) is an Egyptian professional squash player. As of February 2018, he was ranked number 196 in the world.

References

1995 births
Living people
Egyptian male squash players
21st-century Egyptian people